Delias niepelti is a butterfly in the family Pieridae. It was described by Carl Ribbe in 1900. It is endemic to New Guinea. The name honours Friedrich Wilhelm Niepelt.

The wingspan is about 68–76 mm for males and 62–80 mm for females. Adults can be distinguished from all others in the niepelti species group by the absence of a white costal patch on the underside of the hindwings.

Subspecies
D. n. niepelti (Central Highlands, Papua New Guinea)
D. n. henki Yagishita, 1997 (Abmisibil, Irian Jaya)

References

External links
Delias at Markku Savela's Lepidoptera and Some Other Life Forms

niepelti
Butterflies described in 1900
Endemic fauna of New Guinea